Ilyophis robinsae is an eel in the family Synaphobranchidae (cutthroat eels). It was described by Yuri Nikolaevich Shcherbachev and Kenneth J. Sulak in 1997. It is a marine, deep water-dwelling eel which is known from the Philippines, in the Indo-West Pacific.

The species epithet "robinsae" was given in honour of Catherine Robins, credited with making substantial contributions to the knowledge of the family Synaphobranchidae.

References

Synaphobranchidae
Fish described in 1997